Bonami is a French surname meaning "good friend". Notable people with the surname include:

Alexis Bonami (1796–1890), Canadian voyageur and boat brigade leader
Aline Bonami, French mathematician
Francesco Bonami (born 1955), Italian art curator and writer

French-language surnames